Faison is a town in Duplin County in the U.S. state of North Carolina. The population was 961 at the 2010 census.

History
Faison was originally called "Faison's Depot", and under the latter name was founded around 1833. The town was named for Henry Faison, the original owner of the town site. A post office has been in operation at Faison since 1838.

The Faison Cemetery, Faison Historic District, Buckner Hill House, and John Wesley Mallard House are listed on the National Register of Historic Places.

Geography
Faison is located in northwestern Duplin County at  (35.115731, -78.140170). North Carolina Highway 403 leads west  to Interstate 40 at Exit 355.

Demographics

2020 census

As of the 2020 United States census, there were 784 people, 401 households, and 273 families residing in the town.

2000 census
As of the census of 2000, there were 736 people, 316 households, and 136 families residing in the town. The population density was 888.2 people per square mile (342.0/km2). There were 354 housing units at an average density of 422.6 per square mile (162.7/km2). The racial makeup of the town was 64.11% White, 14.78% African American, 0.13% Native American, 20.30% from other races, and 0.67% from two or more races. Hispanic or Latino of any race were 24.73% of the population.

There were 314 households, out of which 27.7% had children under the age of 18 living with them, 43.9% were married couples living together, 11.5% had a female householder with no husband present, and 37.3% were non-families. 33.4% of all households were made up of individuals, and 15.9% had someone living alone who was 65 years of age or older. The average household size was 2.36 and the average family size was 2.93.

In the town, the population was spread out, with 22.6% under the age of 18, 9.8% from 18 to 24, 30.5% from 25 to 44, 20.4% from 45 to 64, and 16.7% who were 65 years of age or older. The median age was 37 years. For every 100 females, there were 95.8 males. For every 100 females age 18 and over, there were 94.6 males.

The median income for a household in the town was $22,788, and the median income for a family was $30,724. Males had a median income of $25,536 versus $20,667 for females. The per capita income for the town was $12,558. About 18.7% of families and 27.5% of the population were below the poverty line, including 26.0% of those under age 18 and 24.3% of those age 65 or over.

Notable people
James W. Blanchard, rear admiral in the U.S. Navy, submarine commander during World War II, Navy Cross recipient
Samson L. Faison, U.S. Army brigadier general in World War I, born in Faison
Betty Ray McCain, North Carolina Secretary of Culture
William E. Thornton, astronaut, medical doctor, inventor, also nephew of James W. Blanchard

References

External links
 Town of Faison official website

Towns in Duplin County, North Carolina
Towns in Sampson County, North Carolina
Towns in North Carolina